Matteo Rizzo (born 10 September 2004) is an Italian professional footballer, who plays as a goalkeeper for Pro Vercelli.

Club career 

Born in Verbania, but raised in Vignone, Rizzo started playing football at the local grassroots club San Francesco, before joining Gozzano in 2018. After several seasons in the club's youth sector, he made his first team debut on June 19, 2021, as he came in as a substitute in the final minutes of the last league match of the season against Folgore Caratese, which ultimately ended in a 3-2 win for his side.

In the summer of 2021, Rizzo joined Pro Vercelli, where he was first assigned to the under-19 squad. However, the following December, the goalkeeper was called-up to the first team by the head coach Franco Lerda, following a streak of injuries occurred to all of the registered senior goalkeepers. He subsequently made his professional debut for the club on December 18, 2021, aged 17, starting and playing the entirety of the Serie C match against Mantova, which ended in a 1-1 draw. Throughout the rest of the 2021–22 season, Rizzo established himself as a regular starter of the first team, as Pro Vercelli reached the promotional play-offs before getting eliminated by Juventus U23 in the second round.

On July 26, 2022, Rizzo signed his first professional contract with Pro Vercelli, penning a two-year deal with an option for a third season.

International career 

Rizzo has represented Italy at several youth international levels, having played for the under-18 and under-19 national teams.

Career statistics

Club

References

External links 
 
 
 

2004 births
Living people
Italian footballers
Association football goalkeepers
Serie C players
A.C. Gozzano players
F.C. Pro Vercelli 1892 players
Footballers from Piedmont